Bat ha-Levi (12th-century), was an Iraqi Jewish scholar. She gave lessons to male students and had a remarkable position for a Jewish woman in 12th-century Iraq.

Her name is not known, and she is known under the name Bat ha-Levi, meaning 'the daughter of the Levite'. She was the daughter of Rabbi Samuel ben Ali (Samuel ha-Levi ben al-Dastur, d. 1194), the Geon of Baghdad.  In the Medieval Middle East, education was normally low for Jewish women, but Bat ha-Levi was a famous exception. She was active as a teacher and gave lessons to her father's male students from a window, with her students listening from the courtyard below.  This arrangement intended to preserve her modesty as well as prevent the students from being diverted from their studies by her appearance.

A eulogy in the form of a poem by R. Eleazar ben Jacob ha-Bavli (c. 1195–1250), is believed to describe the virtues and wisdom of Bat ha-Levi.

Her activities were reported in a medieval travel diary.

See also 
 Miriam Shapira-Luria

References 
 Baskin, J. R. (2012). Educating Jewish Girls in Medieval Muslim and Christian Settings. Making a Difference: Essays on the Bible and Judaism in Honor of Tamara Cohen Eskenazi. Sheffield: Sheffield Phoenix, 19-37.
 Emily Taitz, Sondra Henry & Cheryl Tallan,  The JPS Guide to Jewish Women: 600 B.C.E.to 1900 C.E., 2003
 https://jwa.org/encyclopedia/article/learned-women-in-traditional-jewish-society

12th-century Jews
12th-century women
12th-century people from the Abbasid Caliphate
12th-century educators